Monochamus sartor urussovii is a subspecies of beetle in the family Cerambycidae. It was described by Fischer von Waldheim in 1806. It has been recorded in Eastern and Northern Europe and Northern Asia. It is a vector of the nematode Bursaphelenchus mucronatus. Larvae burrow into the wood of various conifer species and can be a tree pest, as feeding damage reduces the value of the timber.

References

sartor urussovii
Beetles described in 1806